Irredentism is usually understood as a desire that one state annexes a territory of a neighboring state. This desire is motivated by ethnic reasons (because the population of the territory is ethnically similar to the population of the parent state) or by historical reasons (because the territory formed part of the parent state before). However, difficulties in applying the concept to concrete cases have given rise to academic disputes about its precise definition. Disagreements concern whether either or both ethnic and historical reasons have to be present, whether non-state actors can also engage in irredentism, and whether attempts to absorb a full neighboring state are also included. Various scholars discuss different types of irredentism. One categorization distinguishes between cases in which the parent state exists before the conflict and cases in which a new parent state is formed by uniting an ethnic group spread across several countries. Another distinction concerns whether the target country is a state, a former colony, or a collapsed state.

A central research topic concerning irredentism is the question of how it is to be explained or what causes it. Many explanations hold that ethnic homogeneity within a state makes irredentism more likely. Discrimination against the ethnic group in the neighboring territory is another contributing factor. A closely related explanation argues that national identities based primarily on ethnicity, culture, and history increase irredentist tendencies. Another approach is to explain irredentism as an attempt to increase power and wealth. In this regard, it is argued that irredentist claims are more likely if the neighboring territory is relatively rich. Many explanations also focus on the regime type and hold that democracies are less likely to engage in irredentism while anocracies are particularly open to it.

Irredentism has been an influential force in world politics since the mid-nineteenth century. It has been responsible for many armed conflicts even though international law is hostile to it and irredentist movements often fail to achieve their goals. The term was originally coined from the Italian phrase Italia irredenta and referred to an Italian movement after 1878 claiming parts of Switzerland and the Austro-Hungarian Empire. Often discussed cases of irredentism include Nazi Germany's annexation of the Sudetenland in 1938, Somalia's invasion of Ethiopia in 1977, Argentina's invasion of the Falkland Islands in 1982, attempts to establish a Greater Serbia following the breakup of Yugoslavia in the early 1990s, and Russia's annexation of Crimea in 2014. Irredentism is closely related to revanchism and secession. Revanchism is an attempt to annex territory belonging to another state. It is motivated by the negative goal of taking revenge for a previous grievance, in contrast to the positive goal of irredentism of building an ethnically unified nation state. In the case of secession, a territory breaks away and forms an independent state instead of merging with another state.

Definition and etymology 
Irredentism is often understood as the claim that certain territories belonging to one state should be incorporated into another state because their population is ethnically similar or because it historically belonged to the other state before. Many definitions of irredentism have been proposed to give a more precise formulation. Despite a wide overlap concerning its general features, there are still many disagreements about its exact characterization. These disagreements matter for evaluating whether irredentism was the cause of a war is difficult in many cases and different definitions often lead to opposite conclusions.

There is wide consensus that irredentism is a form of territorial dispute involving the attempt to annex territories belonging to a neighboring state. However, not all such attempts constitute forms of irredentism and there is no academic consensus on precisely what other features need to be present. This concerns disagreements about who claims the territory, for what reasons they do so, and how much territory is claimed. Most scholars define irredentism as a claim made by one state on the territory of another state. In this regard, there are three essential entities to irredentism: (1) an irredentist state or parent state, (2) a neighboring host state or target state, and (3) the disputed territory belonging to the host state, often referred to as irredenta. According to this definition, popular movements demanding territorial change by non-state actors do not count as irredentist in the strict sense. A different definition characterizes irredentism as the attempt of the ethnic minority of the territory to be incorporated to break away and join their real motherland even though this minority is a non-state actor.

Another issue concerns the motivation for engaging in the territorial dispute. Some scholars hold irredentism is primarily motivated by ethnicity. On this view, the population in the neighboring territory is ethnically similar and the intention is to unite ethnically kindred people and to retrieve the area they live in. This definition implies, for example, that the majority of the border disputes in the history of Latin America were not forms of irredentism. Usually, irredentism is defined in terms of the motivation of the irredentist state, even if the territory is annexed against the will of the local population. Other theorists focus more on the historical claim that the disputed territory used to be part of the state's ancestral homeland. This is close to the literal meaning of the original Italian expression "terra irredenta" as unredeemed land. On this view, the ethnicity of the people inhabiting this territory is not important. However, it is also possible to combine both characterizations, i.e. that the motivation is either ethnic or historical or both. Some scholars, like Benjamin Neuberger, include geographical reasons in their definitions.

A further disagreement concerns the amount of area that is to be annexed. Usually, irredentism is restricted to the attempt to incorporate some parts of another state. In this regard, irredentism challenges established borders with the neighboring state but does not challenge the existence of the neighboring state in general. However, some definitions of irredentism also include attempts to absorb the whole neighboring state and not just a part of it. In this sense, claims by North Korea to incorporate the whole of South Korea would be considered a form of irredentism.

A popular view combining many of the elements listed above holds that irredentism is based on incongruence between the borders of a state and the boundaries of the corresponding nation. State borders are usually clearly delimited, both physically and on maps. National boundaries, on the other hand, are less tangible since they correspond to a group's perception of its historic, cultural, and ethnic boundaries. Irredentism may manifest if state borders do not correspond to national boundaries. It seeks to enlarge a state to establish a congruence between its borders and the boundaries of the corresponding nation.

The term irredentism was coined from the Italian phrase Italia irredenta (unredeemed Italy). This phrase originally referred to territory controlled by Austria-Hungary but mostly or partly inhabited by ethnic Italians, chiefly Trentino and Trieste, but also Gorizia, Istria, Fiume, and Dalmatia during the 19th and early 20th centuries. Irredentist projects often use the term "Greater" to label the desired outcome of their expansion, as in "Greater Serbia" or "Greater Russia".

Types 

Various types of irredentism have been proposed. However, not everyone agrees that all the types listed here actually constitute forms of irredentism and it often depends on what definition is used. According to Naomi Chazan and Donald L. Horowitz, there are two types of irredentism. The typical case involves one state that intends to annex territories belonging to a neighboring state. Nazi Germany’s claim on the Sudetenland of Czechoslovakia is an example of this form of irredentism. For the second type, there is no pre-existing parent state. Instead, a cohesive group existing as a minority in multiple countries intends to unify to form a new parent state. The intended creation of a Kurdistan state uniting the Kurds living in Turkey, Syria, Iraq, and Iran is an example of the second type. If such a project is successful for only one segment, the result is secession and not irredentism. This happened, for example, during the breakup of Yugoslavia when Yugoslavian Slovenes formed the new state of Slovenia while the Austrian Solvenes did not join them and remained part of Austria.  Not all theorists accept that the second type actually constitutes a form of irredentism. In this regard, it is often argued that it is too similar to secession to maintain a distinction between the two. For example, Benyamin Neuberger holds that a pre-existing parent state is necessary for irredentism.

Thomas Ambrosio restricts his definition to cases involving a pre-existing parent state and distinguishes three types of irredentism: (1) between two states, (2) between a state and a former colony, and (3) between a state and a collapsed state. The typical case is between two states. A classical example of this is Somalia's invasion of Ethiopia. In the second case of decolonization, the territory to be annexed is a former colony of another state and not a regular part of it. An example is the Indonesian invasion and occupation of the former Portuguese colony of East Timor. In the case of state collapse, one state disintegrates and a neighboring state absorbs some of its former territories, as was the case for the irredentist movements by Croatia and Serbia during the breakup of Yugoslavia.

Explanations 
Explanations of irredentism try to determine what causes irredentism, how it unfolds, and how it can be peacefully resolved. Various hypotheses have been proposed but there is still very little consensus on how irredentism is to be explained despite its prevalence and its long history of provoking armed conflicts. Some of these proposals can be combined but others conflict with each other and the available evidence may not be sufficient to decide between them. An active research topic in this regard concerns the reasons for irredentism. Many countries have ethnic kin outside their borders. But only few are willing to engage in violent conflicts to annex foreign territory in an attempt to unite their kin. Research on the causes of irredentism tries to explain why some countries pursue irredentism but others do not. Relevant factors often discussed include ethnicity, nationalism, economic considerations, the desire to increase power, and the type of regime.

Ethnicity and nationalism 

A common explanation of irredentism focuses on ethnic arguments. It is based on the observation that irredentist claims are primarily advanced by states with a homogenous ethnic population. This is explained by the idea that, if a state is composed of several different ethnic groups, then annexing a territory inhabited primarily by one of those groups would shift the power balance in favor of this group. For this reason, other groups in the state are likely to internally reject the irredentist claims. This inhibiting factor is not present for homogenous states. A similar argument is also offered for the enclave to be annexed: an ethnically heterogenous enclave is less likely to desire to be absorbed by another state for ethnic reasons since this would only benefit one ethnic group. These considerations explain, for example, why irredentism is not very common in Africa since most African states are ethnically heterogeneous. Relevant factors for the ethnic motivation for irredentism are how large the dominant ethnic group is relative to other groups, how large it is in absolute terms, whether it is relatively dispersed or located in a small core area, and whether it is politically disadvantaged.

Explanations focusing on nationalism are closely related to ethnicity-based explanations. Nationalism can be defined as the claim that the boundaries of a state should match those of the nation. According to constructivist accounts, for example, the dominant national identity is one of the central factors behind irredentism. On this view, identities based on ethnicity, culture, and history can easily invite tendencies to enlarge national borders with the goal of integrating ethnically and culturally similar territories. Civic national identities focusing more on a political nature, on the other hand, are more closely tied to pre-existing national boundaries. Structural accounts use a slightly different approach and focus on the relation between nationalism and the regional context, specifically on the tension between state sovereignty and national self-determination. State sovereignty is the principle of international law holding that each state has sovereignty over its own territory, meaning that states are not allowed to interfere with essentially domestic affairs of other states. National self-determination, on the other hand, concerns the right of people to determine their own international political status. According to the structural explanation, emphasis on national self-determination may legitimize irredentist claims while the principle of state sovereignty defends the status quo of the existing sovereign borders. This position is supported by the observation that irredentist conflicts are much more common during times of international upheavals.

Another factor commonly cited as a force fueling irredentism is discrimination against the main ethnic group in the enclave. Irredentist states often try to legitimize their aggression against neighbors by presenting them as humanitarian interventions aimed at protecting their discriminated ethnic kin. This justification was used, for example, in Adolf Hitler's irredentist annexation of the Sudetenland, in Armenia's intervention in Nagorno-Karabakh, and in Russia's annexation of Crimea. Some theorists, like David S. Siroky and Christopher W. Hale, hold that there is little empirical evidence for arguments based on ethnic homogeneity and discrimination. On this view, they are mainly used as a pretext to hide different goals, such as material gain.

Another relevant factor is the outlook of the population inhabiting the territory to be annexed. The desire of the irredentist state to annex a foreign territory and the desire of that territory to be annexed do not always overlap. In some cases, a minority group does not want to be annexed, as was the case for the Crimean Tatars in Russia's annexation of Crimea. In other cases, a minority group would want to be annexed but the intended parent state is not interested.

Power and economy 
Various accounts emphasize the role of power and economic benefits as reasons for irredentism. Realist explanations focus on the power balance between the irredentist state and the target state: the more this power balance shifts in favor of the irredentist state, the more likely violent conflicts become. A key factor in this regard is also the reaction of the international community, i.e. whether irredentist claims are tolerated or rejected. Irredentism can be used as a tool or pretext to increase the parent state's power. Rational choice accounts are closely related but focus more on the internal power dynamics within the irredentist state. On this view, irredentism is a tool used by the elites to secure their political interests. They do so by appealing to popular nationalist sentiments. This can be used, for example, to gain public support against political rivals or to divert attention away from domestic problems.

Other explanations focus on economic factors. For example, larger states enjoy certain advantages that come with having an increased market and decreased per capita cost of defense. However, there are also certain disadvantages to having a bigger state, such as the difficulties that come with accommodating a wider range of citizens' preferences. Based on these lines of thought, it has been argued that states are more likely to advocate irredentist claims if the enclave is a relatively rich territory.

Regime type 
A further relevant factor is the regime type of both the irredentist state and the neighboring state. In this regard, it is often argued that democratic states are less likely to engage in irredentism. One reason cited is that their rule is more inclusive concerning all types of ethnic groups. Another is that democracies are in general less likely to engage in violent conflicts. This is closely related to democratic peace theory, which claims that democracies try to avoid armed conflicts with other democracies. This is also supported by the observation that most irredentist conflicts are started by authoritarian regimes. However, irredentism constitutes a paradox for democratic systems since democratic ideals pertaining to the ethnic group can often be used to justify its claim, which may be interpreted as the expression of a popular will toward unification. But there are also cases of irredentism made primarily by a government that are not broadly supported by the population. According to David S. Siroky and Christopher W. Hale, anocratic regimes are most likely to engage in irredentist conflicts and to become their victim. This is based on the idea that they share certain democratic ideals favoring irredentism but often lack institutional stability and accountability. This makes it more likely for the elites to consolidate their power using ethno-nationalist appeals to the masses.

Importance, reactions, and consequences 
Irredentism is a widespread phenomenon and has been an influential force in world politics since the mid-nineteenth century. It has been responsible for countless conflicts. There are still many unresolved irredentist disputes today that constitute discords between countries. In this regard, irredentism is a potential source of conflict in many places and often escalates into military confrontations between states. For example, Markus Kornprobst argues that "no other issue over which states fight is as war-prone as irredentism" and Rachel Walker points out that "there is scarcely a country in the world that is not involved in some sort of irredentist quarrel ... although few would admit to this". Stephen M. Saideman and R. William Ayres argue that many of the most important conflicts of the 1990s were caused by irredentism, such as the wars for a Greater Serbia and a Greater Croatia. Irredentism carries a lot of potential for future conflicts since many countries have kin groups in adjacent countries. It has been argued that it poses a significant danger to human security and the international order. For these reasons, irredentism has been a central topic in the field of international relations.

For the most part, international law is hostile to irredentism. For example, the United Nations Charter calls for respect for established territorial borders and defends state sovereignty. Similar outlooks are taken by the Organization of African Unity, the Organization of American States, and the Helsinki Final Act. Since irredentist claims are based on conflicting sovereignty assertions, it is often difficult to find a working compromise. Peaceful resolutions of irredentist conflicts often result in mutual recognition of de facto borders rather than territorial change. Martin Griffiths et al. argue that the threat of rising irredentism may be reduced by focusing on political pluralism and respect for minority rights.

Irredentist movements, peaceful or violent, are rarely successful. In many cases, despite aiming to help ethnic minorities, irredentism often has the opposite effect and ends up worsening their living conditions. On the one hand, the state still in control of those territories may decide to further discriminate against them as an attempt to decrease the threat to its national security. On the other hand, the irredentist state may merely claim to care about the ethnic minorities but, in truth, use such claims only as a pretext to increase its territory or to destabilize an opponent.

History 

The emergence of irredentism is tied to the rise of modern nationalism and the idea of a nation state, which are often linked to the French Revolution. However, some theorists, like Griffiths et al., argue that phenomena similar to irredentism existed even before. For example, part of the justification of the crusades was to liberate fellow Christians from Muslim rule and to redeem the Holy Land. Nonetheless, most theorists see irredentism as a more recent phenomenon associated with border disputes between modern states. The term originally referred to an Italian movement after 1878 demanding that certain predominantly Italian-speaking areas in Switzerland and the Austro-Hungarian Empire should become part of Italy.

Nazi Germany's annexation of the Sudetenland in 1938 is an often-cited example of irredentism. At the time, the Sudetenland formed part of Czechoslovakia but had a majority German population. Adolf Hitler justified the annexation based on his allegation that Sudeten Germans were being mistreated by the Czech government. The Sudetenland was yielded to Germany following the Munich Agreement in an attempt to prevent the outbreak of a major war.

Somalia's invasion of Ethiopia in 1977 is frequently discussed as a case of African irredentism. The goal of this attack was to unite the significant Somali population living in the Ogaden region with their kin by annexing this area to create a Greater Somalia. The invasion escalated into a major war of attrition that lasted about eight months. Somalia was close to reaching its goal but failed in the end, mainly due to a massive intervention by socialist countries.

Argentina's invasion of the Falkland Islands is often cited as an example of irredentism in South America. In 1982, Argentina tried to seize the Falkland Islands. They were under British control since 1833 but Argentina's claims on them date back before that. Britain managed to decide the conflict in its favor and remained in control due to its superior military force and strong international support. Despite its defeat, Argentina has upheld its claim on the Falkland Islands to this day.

The breakup of Yugoslavia in the early 1990s resulted in various irredentist projects. They include Slobodan Milošević's attempts to establish a Greater Serbia by absorbing various regions of neighboring states that were part of former Yugoslavia. A simultaneous similar project aimed at the establishment of a Greater Croatia.

Russia's annexation of Crimea in 2014 is a more recent example of irredentism. It was justified based on the allegation that the Ukrainian government did not uphold the rights of ethnic Russians inhabiting Crimea. However, it has been claimed that this was only a pretext to increase its territory and power. Other frequently discussed cases of irredentism include disputes between Pakistan and India over Jammu and Kashmir and between Israel and Syria over the Golan Heights as well as China's claims on Taiwan.

Related concepts

Ethnicity 
Ethnicity plays a central role in irredentism since most irredentist states justify their expansionist agenda based on shared ethnicity. In this regard, the goal of unifying different parts of an ethnic group in a common nation state is used as a justification for annexing foreign territories and going to war if the neighboring state resists. Ethnicity is a grouping of people according to a set of shared attributes and similarities. It divides people into different groups based on attributes like physical features, customs, tradition, historical background, language, culture, religion, and values. Not all these factors are equally relevant for every ethnic group. For some groups, one factor may predominate, as in ethno-linguistic, ethno-racial, and ethno-religious identities. In most cases, ethnic identities are based on several common features. A central aspect of many ethnic identities is that all members share a common homeland or place of origin. This place of origin does not have to correspond to the area where the majority of the ethnic group currently lives in case they migrated from their homeland. Another feature is a common language or dialect. In many cases, religion also forms a vital aspect of ethnicity. Shared culture is another significant factor. It is a wide term and can include characteristic social institutions, diet, dress, and other practices. It is often difficult to draw clear boundaries between people based on their ethnicity. For this reason, some definitions focus less on actual objective features and emphasize instead that what unites an ethnic group is a subjective belief that such common features exist. On this view, the common belief matters more than the extent to which those shared features actually exist. Examples of large ethnic groups are the Han Chinese, the Arabs, the Bengalis, the Punjabis, and the Turks.

Some theorists, like John Milton Yinger, use terms like ethnic group or ethnicity as near-synonyms for nation. Nations are usually based on ethnicity. But what distinguishes them from ethnicity is their political form as a state or a state-like entity. The physical and visible aspects of ethnicity, such as skin color and facial features, are often referred to as race, which may thus be understood as a subset of ethnicity. However, some theorists, like Pierre van den Berghe, contrast the two by restricting ethnicity to cultural traits and race to physical traits.

Ethnic solidarity can provide a sense of belonging as well as physical and psychological security. It can help individuals identify with a common purpose. However, ethnicity has also been the source of many conflicts. It has been responsible for various forms of mass violence, including ethnic cleansing and genocide. The perpetrators usually form part of the ruling majority and target ethnic minority groups. Not all ethnic-based conflicts involve mass violence, like many forms of ethnic discrimination. The term ethnicity originates in the Ancient Greek term ethnos, meaning "peoples".

Nationalism and nation state

Irredentism is often understood as a product of modern nationalism, i.e. the claim that a nation should have its own sovereign state. In this regard, irredentism emerged with and depends on the modern idea of nation states. The start of modern nationalism is often associated with the French Revolution in 1789. This spawned various nationalist revolutions in Europe around the mid-nineteenth century. They often resulted in a replacement of dynastic imperial governments. A central aspect of nationalism is that it sees states as entities with clearly delimited borders that should correspond to national boundaries. Irredentism reflects the importance people ascribe to these borders and how exactly they are drawn. One difficulty in this regard is that the exact boundaries are often difficult to justify and are therefore challenged in favor of alternatives. Irredentism manifests some of the most aggressive aspects of modern nationalism. It can be seen as a side effect of nationalism paired with the importance it ascribes to borders and the difficulties in agreeing on them.

Secession 

Irredentism is closely related to secession. Secession can be defined as "an attempt by an ethnic group claiming a homeland to withdraw with its territory from the authority of a larger state of which it is a part." Irredentism, by contrast, is initiated by members of an ethnic group in one state to incorporate territories across their border housing ethnically kindred people. Secession happens when a part of an existing state breaks away to form an independent entity. In the case of irredentism, the break-away area does not become independent but merges into another entity. Irredentism is often seen as a government decision, unlike secession. Both movements are influential phenomena in contemporary politics but, as Horowitz argues, secession movements are much more frequent in postcolonial states. However, he also holds that secession movements are less likely to succeed since they usually have very few military resources compared to irredentist states. For this reason, they normally require prolonged external assistance, often from another state. However, such state policies are subject to change. For example, the Indian government supported the Sri Lankan Tamil secessionists until 1987 but then reach an agreement with the Sri Lankan government and helped suppress the movement.

Horowitz holds that it is important to distinguish secessionist and irredentist movements since they differ significantly concerning their motivation, context, and goals. Despite these differences, irredentism and secessionism are closely related nonetheless. In some cases, the two tendencies may exist side by side. It is also possible that the advocates of one movement change their outlook and promote the other. Whether a movement favors irredentism or secessionism is determined, among other things, by the prospects of forming an independent state in contrast to joining another state. A further factor is whether the irredentist state is likely to espouse a similar ideology to the one found in the territory intending to break away. The anticipated reaction of the international community is an additional factor, i.e. whether it would embrace, tolerate, or reject the detachment or the absorption by another state.

Revanchism 
Irredentism and Revanchism are two closely related phenomena since both involve the attempt to annex territory belonging to another state. But they differ concerning the motivation fuelling this attempt. Irredentism has a positive goal of building a "greater" state that fulfills the ideals of a nation state: to unify people claimed to belong together because of their shared national identity based on ethnic, cultural, and historical aspects. For revanchism, on the other hand, the goal is more negative and focuses on taking revenge for some form of grievance or injustice suffered earlier. In this regard, it is motivated by resentment and aims to reverse territorial losses due to a previous defeat. In an attempt to distinguish irredentism from revanchism, Anna M. Wittmann argues that Germany's annexation of the Sudetenland in 1938 constitutes a form of irredentism because of its emphasis on a shared language and ethnicity. But she characterizes Germany's invasion of Poland the following year as a form of revanchism due to its justification as a revenge intended to reverse previous territorial losses. The term "revanchism" comes from the French term , meaning revenge. It was originally used in the aftermath of the Franco-Prussian War for nationalists intending to reclaim the lost territory of Alsace-Lorraine.

See also

References

Sources

External links

 

 
Divided regions
International relations theory
Pan-nationalism
Territorial disputes